Moral order may refer to:

 The conservative and monarchic French government of Patrice de Mac-Mahon in the late 19th century
 Immanuel Kant's rendering of the metaphysical argument from morality
 A social structure and transcendent moral code derived from natural law in the philosophy of traditionalist conservatism
 Maat, the ancient Egyptian concept of a moral order or justice

See also 
 Antinomianism